The Tour de Perth is an amateur road bicycle racing stage-race in Australia, established in 2006. There was a women's stage race between 2007 and 2009.

Honours

Men's

Women's 

Source

References

Women's road bicycle races
Defunct cycling races in Australia
Cycling in Perth, Western Australia
Recurring sporting events established in 2006
2006 establishments in Australia
2013 disestablishments in Australia
Recurring sporting events disestablished in 2013
Defunct sports competitions in Australia
Cycle races in Australia